General elections were held in Monaco on 23 April 1911 to elect the 12 members of the National Council. A total of 20 candidates participated in the election. Out of the 629 registered voters, 524 (or 83.3%) voters cast their ballots.

Results

References 

Elections in Monaco
Monaco
Parliamentary election
April 1911 events in Europe